Hugo Victor Flinn (8 September 1879 – 28 January 1943) was an Irish Fianna Fáil politician and businessman.

He was born in Peel, Isle of Man in 1879, one of four children of Hugo Flinn, wholesale fish merchant with wide interests in Ireland and Liverpool, and his wife (Mary) Kate (née Condren or Condran). The family's residence alternated on a six-month basis between Arklow, County Wicklow, and Kinsale, County Cork, according to the seasonal nature of the fish trade. He was educated at Dungarvan, Kinsale, Mungret College, and Clongowes Wood College  (1892–1897). He graduated from the Royal University of Ireland in 1899.

His family moved to England where he qualified as an electrical engineer and worked with the Liverpool Electricity Supply Board. He assumed the management of his father's business before joining the British Army on the outbreak of World War I. Attached to the Ordnance Corps, he was demobilised as a captain in 1918. On the death of his father in 1919, he disposed of the family business and established himself in Cork as an electrical engineer.

In 1925 he came to public attention when he started a campaign to abolish Income tax.

Flinn was courted by the Fianna Fáil party and was first elected to Dáil Éireann as a Fianna Fáil Teachta Dála (TD) for the Cork Borough constituency at the September 1927 general election. He retained his seat at each subsequent election until his death in 1943. No by-election was held for his seat.

After Fianna Fáil's election victory in 1932 Flinn was appointed as Parliamentary Secretary to the Minister for Finance. In 1939, he was also appointed as Parliamentary Secretary to the Minister for Local Government and Public Health, serving in both positions until his death. 

As Minister of State, he devoted much of his time to the relief of unemployment. On the outbreak of World War II he was appointed turf controller and charged with the task of producing enough fuel to replace the two million tons of coal hitherto imported.

References

 

1879 births
1943 deaths
Alumni of the Royal University of Ireland
British Army personnel of World War I
Fianna Fáil TDs
Manx people
Members of the 10th Dáil
Members of the 6th Dáil
Members of the 7th Dáil
Members of the 8th Dáil
Members of the 9th Dáil
Parliamentary Secretaries of the 10th Dáil
Parliamentary Secretaries of the 7th Dáil
Parliamentary Secretaries of the 8th Dáil
Parliamentary Secretaries of the 9th Dáil
People educated at Clongowes Wood College
Politicians from County Cork
Royal Logistic Corps officers